Hard pop may refer to:

Easycore
Glam metal
Kawaii metal
Pop metal
Pop punk
Pop rock
Power pop

See also
Hard music (disambiguation)
Hard rock (disambiguation)
New Wave (disambiguation)
Synth-pop